Peter Ouaneh (born 4 April 1998) is a professional footballer who plays as a defender for Championnat National club LB Châteauroux. Born in the Democratic Republic of the Congo, he is a former France youth international.

Club career
On 9 May 2018, Ouaneh signed his first professional contract with Lorient. Ouaneh made his professional debut Lorient in a 1-0 Coupe de la Ligue win over Valenciennes on 14 August 2018. On 17 October 2019, Ouaneh joined Championnat National club Le Puy on loan for the rest of the season. In June 2020, Ouaneh joined fellow Championnat National club Concarneau, this time on a permanent deal signing a two-year contract.

On 22 June 2021, Ouaneh signed for Châteauroux.

International career
Ouaneh was born in Kinshasa, Congo and moved to France at a young age. He is a youth international for France, having represented the France U18s at the 2015 FIFA U-17 World Cup.

References

External links
 
 
 
 FCL Profile
 
 

1998 births
Living people
French footballers
Footballers from Kinshasa
France youth international footballers
Democratic Republic of the Congo footballers
Democratic Republic of the Congo emigrants to France
Association football defenders
Footballers from Brittany
Sportspeople from Morbihan
FC Lorient players
Le Puy Foot 43 Auvergne players
US Concarneau players
LB Châteauroux players
Ligue 2 players
Championnat National players